Roberto Fernández Jaén (born 3 July 2002) is a Spanish footballer who plays as a forward for FC Barcelona Atlètic, on loan from Málaga CF.

Club career
Born in Puente Genil, Córdoba, Andalusia, Fernández represented Puente Genil FC, Córdoba CF, Sevilla FC and Málaga CF as a youth. On 4 December 2020, while still a youth, he renewed his contract with the latter side until 2024.

On 16 August 2021, before even having appeared for the reserves, Fernández made his first-team debut by starting in a 0–0 home draw against CD Mirandés in the Segunda División. He scored his first professional goal six days later, netting the equalizer in a 2–2 away draw against UD Ibiza.

On 22 July 2022, Fernández joined FC Barcelona on a one-year loan deal, being initially assigned to the reserves in Primera Federación.

References

External links

2002 births
Living people
Sportspeople from the Province of Córdoba (Spain)
Spanish footballers
Footballers from Andalusia
Association football forwards
Segunda División players
Primera Federación players
Tercera Federación players
Atlético Malagueño players
Málaga CF players
FC Barcelona Atlètic players